Chovanie Amatkarijo (born 20 May 1999) is a Dutch footballer who plays for Östersunds FK in the Swedish Superettan.

Club career

The Netherlands
Amatkarijo joined ADO Den Haag as a teenager and first played for the U21s as a 16 year old in a match vs SC Heerenveen U21, coming on as a substitute for Maarten Rieder on 9th May 2016, scoring his first goal in the process.

Amatkarijo made his professional debut at 18 years of age in the Eredivisie for ADO Den Haag on 29 January 2017 in a game against AFC Ajax.

He did not appear for the first team again but continued to impress for Jong ADO, scoring a hat-trick against Jong Vitesse.  After starting against Willem II in Ricardo Kishna's comeback game, he scored another hat-trick against Heracles, linking up well with Johnny Reynolds and Tyrone Owusu.

He was loaned to RKC Waalwijk for the 2017–18 season in the Eerste Divisie.

On 2 September 2019, Amatkarijo joined TOP Oss on an amateur contract. However, the club announced on 17 October 2019, that Amatkarijo alongside two other players, had left the club due to personal reasons.

Amatkarijo joined SVV Scheveningen in January 2020.

Sweden
In January 2021, he moved to Swedish club IF Karlstad, who compete in the third-tier Ettan.

On 9 March 2022, Amatkarijo signed a two-year contract with Östersunds FK in the Swedish second-tier Superettan.

References

External links
 
 

1999 births
Living people
Dutch footballers
Association football wingers
Eredivisie players
ADO Den Haag players
RKC Waalwijk players
TOP Oss players
SVV Scheveningen players
Östersunds FK players
Eerste Divisie players
Tweede Divisie players
Dutch expatriate footballers
Expatriate footballers in Sweden
Dutch expatriate sportspeople in Sweden